Shaun Monson is an American film director and producer and activist for animal rights and environmentalism. He wrote, directed, and produced the 2005 documentary Earthlings, which covers animal rights issues within industries such as pets, food, fashion, entertainment, and animal testing.

Monson is a founding partner of Nation Earth, the production company responsible for Earthlings. Monson made a follow-up to Earthlings called Unity which explores the unifying force of consciousness found in humans, animals, and nature.

Monson became a vegetarian in the mid-1990s and vegan shortly thereafter. He lives in Malibu, California, near Los Angeles.

Filmography

See also
 List of animal rights advocates

External links

 
 Animal Voices - Interview

Year of birth missing (living people)
Living people
American animal rights activists
American documentary filmmakers
American environmentalists
American film directors
American film producers
American veganism activists